Leland Lester Mendenhall (January 6, 1892 – October 4, 1970) was an American football, basketball, baseball, and tennis coach and college athletics administrator. He served as the head football coach (1921 to 1924), head basketball coach (1921 to 1924) and head baseball coach (1922 to 1923) at the University of Northern Iowa (then known as Iowa State Teachers College) in Cedar Falls, Iowa. Mendenhall also coached tennis at Iowa State Teachers and was the school's athletic director.

Mendenhall was a 1916 football letter winner at the University of Iowa.

Mendenhall died on October 4, 1970, at Sartori Memorial Hospital in Cedar Falls.

Head coaching record

College football

References

External links
 

1892 births
1970 deaths
American football halfbacks
Carleton Knights baseball coaches
Carleton Knights football coaches
Carleton Knights men's basketball coaches
Drake Bulldogs football players
Iowa Hawkeyes football players
Northern Iowa Panthers athletic directors
Northern Iowa Panthers baseball coaches
Northern Iowa Panthers football coaches
Northern Iowa Panthers men's basketball coaches
College tennis coaches in the United States
High school basketball coaches in Iowa
High school football coaches in Iowa
People from Madison County, Iowa
Coaches of American football from Iowa
Players of American football from Iowa
Baseball coaches from Iowa
Basketball coaches from Iowa